Brittney Leigh Lower is an American actress known for her roles as Liz in Man Seeking Woman, Tanya Sitkowsky in Unforgettable and Helly R in Severance.

Early life
Lower was born on August 2, 1985, in Heyworth, Illinois, to Steven Lower and face painting artist Mickey Lower. After graduating from Heyworth High School in 2004, Lower earned a Bachelor of Science in Communication from Northwestern University in 2008. 

Lower worked with Upright Citizens Brigade and ImprovOlympic.

Career
Lower had a recurring role as technology expert Tanya Sitkowsky in the 2011 series Unforgettable. In 2015, she began what's considered her breakout role in the FXX comedy series Man Seeking Woman, portraying Liz Greenberg, the sister of the main protagonist. Lower was signed for a recurring role in the Hulu original series Casual in season 2, as Sarah Finn. She has also appeared in commercials for Verizon.

Lower appeared as a guest on The Big Alakens Big Lake marathon fundraiser episode of The George Lucas Talk Show.

In 2022, Lower was in the main cast of the Apple TV+ psychological drama series Severance. She will also appear in the second season of American Horror Stories. 

During the hiatus between seasons of Severence, she joined St. Louis' Circus Flora, playing a character in their "Quest for the Innkeeper's Cask" performance for a month.

Filmography

Film

Television

Awards and nominations

References

External links
 
 
 

21st-century American actresses
American film actresses
American television actresses
Northwestern University alumni
Living people
People from McLean County, Illinois
Actresses from Illinois
Year of birth missing (living people)